Coleophora desultrix is a moth of the family Coleophoridae.

References

desultrix
Moths described in 1997